Kuhsalar-e Olya (also Romanized as Kūhsālār-e ‘Olyā; also known as Kūsālār-e ‘Olyā and Kūsālār-e Bālā) is a village in Barvanan-e Markazi Rural District, Torkamanchay District, Meyaneh County, East Azerbaijan Province, Iran. At the 2006 census, its population was 254, in 63 families.

References 

Populated places in Meyaneh County